The Research Board was described in 1984 by The New York Times as "a low-profile New York group composed of chief data processing executives of 50 of the nation's largest corporations." A decade later The Times described it as
"a high-tech consulting firm."

Although by late 2017 a Wall Street Journal writer spoke of "The Research Board" in the past tense, this was just a technicality. Having been acquired by Gartner in 1998, it is sometimes referred to as The Gartner Research Board or The Research Board Gartner.

History
The Research Board was established in 1973.

Leadership
Peter Sole became CEO in 1998. Others with leadership positions were/are:
 Naomi O. Seligman
 Patricia L. Higgins, former Alcoa CIO.

References

Business organizations